is a train station on the West Japan Railway Company (JR West) Sakurajima Line (JR Yumesaki Line) in Konohana-ku, Osaka, Japan.  The station has the same name as the station in Universal Studios Hollywood, Universal City Station.

Layout

The station has two side platforms serving two tracks under the footbridge with ticket machines and ticket gates.

History
The station was built on 1 March 2001, for the Universal Studios Japan.

When service began at Universal City station, there were some protests by local residents and business owners to open a new station ("Haruhinode Station") between Nishi-Kujō and Ajikawaguchi stations. However, not enough demand was forecast and plans were shelved.

Station numbering was introduced in March 2018 with Universal City being assigned station number JR-P16.

Surrounding area

Universal Studios Japan

 Universal City

References

External links

JR West (Universal City Station) 

Konohana-ku, Osaka
Railway stations in Osaka
Stations of West Japan Railway Company
Railway stations in Japan opened in 2001